Anna Kaiulani (1842–?) was a noble member of the House of Kalākaua during the Kingdom of Hawaii. Two of her siblings became ruling monarchs.

Life
She was born in 1842 to the High Chiefess Analea Keohokālole and the High Chief Caesar Kapaakea.  She was a younger sister of James Kaliokalani, David Kalākaua, and Lydia Kamakaeha, and the older sister of Kaiminaauao, Miriam K. Likelike and William Pitt Leleiohoku II. The name Kaʻiulani translates from the Hawaiian language as The Royal Sacred One.

She was, according to Hawaiian tradition of hānai, adopted by the Princess Kekauʻōnohi, who was the granddaughter of Kamehameha I, the royal governor of the island of Kauai and foster mother of Abigail Maheha.

She died young.
Her niece, Victoria Kaʻiulani (who shared her Hawaiian name) became Hawaii's crown princess but died aged twenty-three.

She is not buried at the Royal Mausoleum at Mauna ʻAla in the Nuʻuanu Valley with her siblings and parents.

Ancestry

References

1842 births
Royalty of the Hawaiian Kingdom
Kaiulani, Anne
Year of death unknown
Hawaiian adoptees (hānai)